Samo Medved (born 22 March 1962) is a Slovenian archer. He competed at the 1992 Summer Olympics and the 1996 Summer Olympics.

References

1962 births
Living people
Slovenian male archers
Olympic archers of Slovenia
Archers at the 1992 Summer Olympics
Archers at the 1996 Summer Olympics
Sportspeople from Ljubljana